The year 1989 was the 208th year of the Rattanakosin Kingdom of Thailand. It was the 44th year of the reign of King Bhumibol Adulyadej (Rama IX), and is reckoned as the year 2532 in the Buddhist Era.

Incumbents
King: Bhumibol Adulyadej
Crown Prince: Vajiralongkorn
Prime Minister: Chatichai Choonhavan
Supreme Patriarch: Nyanasamvara Suvaddhana

Events

 31 August - The separatist group Patani Malays People's Consultative Council is founded.
 4 November - Typhoon Gay makes landfall in Chumphon Province after having surprised forecasters in its development.

Births

Deaths

References

 
Years of the 20th century in Thailand
Thailand
Thailand
1980s in Thailand